The Homosexual Initiative Vienna (HOSI Wien) was founded in Vienna in 1979. It is Austria's oldest and largest gay, lesbian and bisexual association. It is a member-based organisation holding an annual general meeting and board elections. The organisation supports several sub groups including a youth group and women's group. It organises the annual Vienna Pride and Rainbow Parade.

Origin of the name 

HOSI is the abbreviation for homosexual initiative and is used as a prefix by several different organisations which advocate for the rights of gay, lesbian and bisexual people in Austria and some neighbouring countries, such as HOSI Linz, HOSI Salzburg, HOSI Tirol. HOSI is also used to refer to these organisations collectively.

Activities 

HOSI Vienna have worked to secure LGBT rights in Austria. In the 1980s and 1990s, HOSI Wien was very active in the HIV/ AIDS movement. It maintains the Names Project Wien, a HIV/AIDS memorial quilt initiative started in 1992.

It has produced the magazine LAMBDA-Nachrichten since 1979, the oldest German language gay and lesbian magazine. It runs a community centre in the Naschmarkt called Glugg, which also serves as the organisation's office, archives and storage facilities. It houses meeting rooms and a stage, and runs a theatre group, The HOSIsters.

Marches and parades 

HOSI Wien organised the first gay rights half-day festival and unofficial march in Vienna in 1982, attended by approximately 100 people. This was followed by the first Pride parade in 1984, organised by a range of gay and lesbian groups as part of a Gay Pride Week (“Warme Woche”). Approximately 300 participants marched down Kärntner Straße.

In 1989, HOSI Wien organised a gay marriage parade with unofficial weddings.

Following the bankruptcy of the previous organisers CSD Wien in 2003, HOSI Wien took over the organisation of the Rainbow Parade. They organised the 8th Europride in 2001 and the 26th Europride which took place in 2019 in Vienna.

References

External links 
 Official website

LGBT organisations in Austria
Organisations based in Vienna